Reginald Anthony Lewis (January 20, 1954 – September 19, 2008) was an American football defensive lineman who played three seasons in the National Football League for the New Orleans Saints. He was drafted in the 1976 NFL Draft by the San Francisco 49ers, but chose to play in the Canadian Football League for the Calgary Stampeders and the Toronto Argonauts, where he was a three time All-Star.

Lewis played college football at San Diego State University. He died in September 2008 at the age of 54.

References

1954 births
2008 deaths
American football defensive linemen
American players of Canadian football
Calgary Stampeders players
Canadian football defensive linemen
New Orleans Saints players
Players of American football from New Orleans
Players of Canadian football from New Orleans
San Diego State Aztecs football players
Toronto Argonauts players